Frederick Groves may refer to:

Frederick Groves (footballer, born 1891), English footballer who played for Glossop, Arsenal, Brighton and Charlton Athletic
Frederick Groves (footballer, born 1892) (1892–1980), English footballer who played for Huddersfield Town, Sheffield United and Pontypridd
Fred Groves (actor) (1880–1955), British actor
Fred Groves (politician) (1924–1995), Canadian politician

See also
Frederick Philip Grove, German-Canadian author
Fred Grove (1913–2008), Native-American author